Singaporean Hokkien is a local variety of the Hokkien language spoken natively in Singapore. Within Chinese linguistic academic circles, this dialect is known as Singaporean Ban-lam Gu. It bears similarities with the Amoy spoken in Amoy, now better known as Xiamen, as well as Taiwanese Hokkien which is spoken in Taiwan.

Hokkien is the Min Nan pronunciation for the province of Fujian, and is generally the term used by the Chinese in Southeast Asia to refer to the 'Banlam' dialect. Singaporean Hokkien generally views Amoy as its prestige dialect, and its accent is predominantly based on a mixture of Quanzhou and Zhangzhou speech, with a greater inclination towards the former. 

Like many spoken languages in Singapore, Singaporean Hokkien is influenced by other languages or dialects spoken in Singapore. For instance, Singaporean Hokkien is influenced to a certain degree by Teochew, and is sometimes regarded as a combined Hokkien–Teochew speech. In addition, it has many loanwords from Singapore's four official languages of English, Malay, Mandarin and Tamil.

Nevertheless, the grammar and tones of Singaporean Hokkien are still largely based on Banlam. When compared to the Taiwanese accent spoken in Tainan and Kaohsiung, the accent and pronunciation of Singaporean Hokkien inclines toward the Quanzhou accent, which is also close to the pronunciation of Taipei and Xiamen, and is less close to that of Tainan, which has a greater inclination towards the Zhangzhou accent.

History
From the 19th until the early half of the 20th century, there was a large influx of Chinese migrants from southern China into Singapore. This led to Chinese constituting almost 75% of Singapore's population. Of these Chinese, many originated from the regions of Quanzhou and Zhangzhou in Fujian province. They brought Min Nan to Singapore, which was then propagated throughout the Malayan region. As there was no formal Chinese name for Min Nan in the early 20th century, these migrants began to use their place of origin as the name of their speech, and thus called the dialect "Hokkien", referring to Fujian province.

During the 19th century, many traditional private Chinese schools in Singapore (referred to as ) generally used Hokkien to teach Chinese classics and Classical Chinese. However, by the early 20th century, Mandarin began to replace Hokkien as the medium of instructions in Chinese schools after the founding of many Mandarin-medium schools.

During the 1950s and 1960s, many political speeches in Singapore were in Hokkien, in order to reach out to the Chinese community in Singapore. There was also a thriving Hokkien cultural scene that included Hokkien story-telling, opera, and media in Singapore.

After 1979, the Singapore government began to push for the use of Mandarin in Singapore, spearheaded by the Speak Mandarin Campaign. Following this, the Singapore government also began to employ a more stringent censorship, or ban, of Hokkien media in the Singaporean Chinese media. Consequently, all Hokkien-language media in Singapore had to be dubbed in Mandarin before being allowed to stream on national TV. 

In addition, the 1980s saw Chinese-medium education replaced by that in English, causing English to emerge as the most widely used language in Singapore. The emergence of the English language, coupled with heavy promotion of Mandarin, generally led Hokkien to decline in Singapore after 1979.

Current status
Today, the lingua franca of the Chinese community in Singapore is Mandarin. Although Hokkien is still widely spoken in Singapore today, it is not as widespread as before and is mostly restricted to the older generations.  The most common places to hear Hokkien spoken in Singapore are at the country's hawker centres or kopi tiams.

Speaking ability varies amongst the different age groups of the Hokkien Singaporeans. The elderly are generally able to communicate effectively in Hokkien. On the other hand, the middle and younger generations, while generally proficient, have generally lost the ability to communicate as fluently. However, when it comes to using profanities, majority of the younger generation, even among non-Chinese Singaporeans, listed Hokkien as the first out of all languages and dialects. With the Speak Mandarin Campaign from the government, the Hokkien speaking population has been on a gradual decline.

Revival in the 2010s
There is, however, groups of Hokkien Singaporeans working to help preserve, spread and revive the use of Singaporean Hokkien in the country.

The ease of access to online Hokkien entertainment media and pop music from the internet has helped to connect to the language and culture. Many Singaporeans are increasingly using online and social media platforms to learn, discuss, meet, and interact with each other in Hokkien.

Some of the groups include:

 Facebook Singapore Hokkien Language and Culture Society: Discussion forum on all aspects of Hokkien Chinese, with a primary focus on the Singaporean Hokkien dialect and its variations from other forms of Hokkien.
 Facebook Singapore Hokkien Meetup: Group that organizes regular meetups for language practice. It also organizes free language courses and sharing sessions for those who are interested.
 Singapore Hokkien Language Meetup Group: Same as the Facebook group, but organized over Meetup.

Phonology

Consonants

Vowels

When ⟨ia⟩ is followed by final ⟨-n⟩ or ⟨-t⟩, it is pronounced [iɛ], with ⟨ian⟩ and ⟨iat⟩ being pronounced as [iɛn] and [iɛt̚] respectively.

Variation

Regional accents and tones
When Singaporeans speak Hokkien, they do so with various accents and tones largely from Tong'an, Anxi, Nan'an, Kinmen as well as Yongchun, Jinjiang, Longhai City and Southern Zhangzhou accents. In practice, it is common for Singaporeans to mix English conjunctions such as "and" into a Hokkien sentence. Some would include honn (乎) (an exclamatory remark in Jinjiang /Nan'an), in addition to the widely used Hokkien exclamatory particles la or loo.

No distinction between literary and vernacular readings
In saying years or numbers, Singaporean Hokkien normally does not differentiate between literary or vernacular readings of Chinese characters. In Taiwan or Amoy, a distinction is usually made. For instance, the year 1980 would be said with a literary pronunciation; but in Singapore, no differentiation is made and is pronounced as otherwise vernacular .

As another instance, Taiwanese would speak telephone numbers using literary readings, whereas Singaporeans would use vernacular ones instead.

Influence from Southern Zhangzhou and Teochew Phonology

Vowel shift from ing to eng
This change is similar to pronunciation in regions south of Zhangzhou—Dongshan, Yunxiao, Zhangpu, Pinghe, Zhao'an counties (southern Zhangzhou accent)—and in Teochew and Cantonese.

Below is a table illustrating the difference:

Pronunciation of 'I'
In Amoy/Taiwanese Hokkien pronunciation,  (lit.

Grammar
There are some differences between the sentence structure used by Singaporean Hokkien and by Amoy/Taiwanese Hokkien.

For instance, when asking a question "do you want to...?", Singaporean Hokkien typically uses the sentence structure , whereas Taiwan uses . The word  is commonly used in Singaporean Hokkien to mean "want to", but in Amoy Hokkien and Taiwan Hokkien, the word  (which means "want" in Hokkien) is used instead.  in Amoy and Taiwanese Hokkien it typically means "love to" or "need to".

Also, unlike Taiwanese Hokkien—which typically uses the word  (meaning "whether or not") when asking a question, which is more formal or polite—Singaporean Hokkien does not use the word . Instead, it simply adds the word  at the end of the sentence to indicate that it is a question (similar to Mandarin's  or adds a Cantonese intonation  at the end. Adding the word  at the end of a sentence is also used in Taiwanese Hokkien, when one is asking a question in an informal way.

Numerals

The following list shows the colloquial readings of the numerals used to count objects.

Most ordinal numbers are formed by adding  in front of a cardinal number. In some cases, the literary reading of the number must then be used. For example,  = ,  = .

Differences from other Hokkien varieties

There are minor differences between Singaporean Hokkien and Amoy or Taiwanese in terms of vocabulary, pronunciation, and grammar. Amoy and Taiwanese bear close resemblance, and are usually considered the prestige dialect of Hokkien, differing only in terms of vocabulary.

Unique vocabulary

Although Singaporean Hokkien is similar to Amoy or Taiwanese, there exist certain unique Singaporean Hokkien words, which are different from those two aforementioned dialects.

Same meaning, different words

Same word, different pronunciation

There are some words used in Singaporean Hokkien that are the same in Taiwanese Hokkien, but are pronounced differently.

Influences from other languages
Because Singapore is a multilingual country, Singaporean Hokkien has been influenced by many other languages spoken in Singapore. As a result, there are many non-Hokkien words that have been imported into Singaporean Hokkien, such as those from Malay, Teochew, Cantonese, and English.

Loanwords from other Chinese varieties
There are words in Singaporean Hokkien that originated from other Chinese variants spoken in Singapore.

Malay loanwords
The following are the common Malay loanwords used in Singaporean Hokkien. Most of them are also used in Amoy.

English loanwords
There are also many English loanwords used in Singaporean Hokkien. They are usually used when the speaker does not know the Hokkien equivalent. Some of these English terms are related to working and living in Singapore

Vocabulary from Old Chinese

Certain colloquial pronunciations of Singaporean Hokkien words are directly inherited from the consonant system of Old Chinese. Hokkien did not experience a great phonological change throughout the transition period from Old Chinese to Middle Chinese.

Min dialects, including Hokkien, preserved a unique feature of Old Chinese: it does not have labiodental consonants. This marks a major difference between Old Chinese and Middle Chinese.

Cultural use

In religion

Hokklo Taoist priests are the largest group among Taoist clergy community in Singapore, they had always conduct their religious services in Hokkien and still continue to do so. Most Tangki or Chinese mediums from Hokkien temples also communicate in Hokkien during spiritual consultation. Some of the Chinese Buddhist temples in Singapore continue to recite the Buddhist scriptures in Hokkien during their daily worship services. The scriptures contain Singapore-style Hokkien romanization are available to assist during the scriptural recitation. There are also Hokkien Buddhist sermons CDs made available and distribute among Hokkien communities in Singapore and overseas. Some of the Chinese Christian churches in Singapore also have services conducted in Singaporean Hokkien.

Music
There exist Singaporean Hokkien writings, folk adages, and ballads written by early Chinese immigrants to Singapore.

Amongst the folk ballads, a few outstanding writings tell of the history and hardship of early Chinese immigrants to Singapore.

There are 18 sections in the poetry ballad "行船歌" (Hâng-tsûn-kua) ("Songs of traveling on a boat"), which talks about how early immigrants migrated to Singapore.

There is another ballad called "砰嘭水中流" (Pin-pong-tsúi-tiong-lâu) ("Flow in the midst of water"):

An example of a folk love ballad is "雪梅思君" (Suat-m̂-su-kun) ("Snow and plum thinking of a gentlemen"), on the loyalty and chastity of love.

An example of love poetry is "針線情" (tsiam-suànn-tsiânn） ("The emotions of needle and thread"):

Getai

Singapore also held Getai during traditional Chinese festivals, for instance the Zhong Yuan Festival. During the Getai event, it is common to speak a number of Chinese dialects, including Hokkien, Teochew, and Cantonese. During the 1960s, Hokkien song was particularly popular. The Singapore Hokkien star Chen Jin Lang (陳金浪) was once the compere and main singer during the Hungry Ghost Festival. His famous song "10 levels of Hades" ("十殿閻君") was especially popular.

In opera

Early Singaporean Hokkien opera had its origins in Gaojia opera, which was brought from Quanzhou to Singapore during the late 19th century. In 1927, the Taiwanese Gezai opera spread to Singapore. Because its lyrics and singing style were easier to understand, it made a great impact on Singapore. Consequently, by the mid 20th century, it had replaced Gaojia opera to become the mainstream Hokkien opera in Singapore.

Currently, Singapore Hokkien opera is performed by two older troupes—Sin Sai Hong Hokkien Opera Troupe (新賽風閩劇團) and Xiao Kee Lin Hokkien Opera Troupe (筱麒麟閩劇團)—and three newer troupes—Sio Gek Leng Hokkien Opera Troupe (筱玉隆閩劇團), Ai Xin Hokkien Opera Troupe (愛心歌仔戲團), and Do Opera [Hokkien] (延戲[福建歌仔戲]), which is the newest.

A Singapore Chinese opera school nurtures talents in opera, including Hokkien opera.

In movies
Singapore Hokkien movies began to appear in the late 1990s, notably by dubbing in Hokkien mainstream Chinese movies made in Singapore. Amongst these, movies directed by Jack Neo, such as I Not Stupid and Money No Enough were popular. They reflected the social environment of local Singaporeans.

In radio
Although Singapore radios started to ban Hokkien in the 1980s, Rediffusion Singapore continued to broadcast in Hokkien and greatly contributed to the culture of Singapore. For instance, the Hokkien story-telling program Amoy folks story (廈語民間故事), by Xu Shumei (許淑梅), was very popular.

Nanyin

Nanyin (Southern Music) first spread to Singapore in 1901. Many immigrants from Quanzhou began to establish various Nanyin organizations.

Those which survive include the Siong Leng Musical Association, which was established in 1941. It was responsible for promoting Nanyin, as well as Liyuan opera. In 1977, the then chairman of the association, Ting Ma Cheng (丁馬成), advocated for the ASEAN Nanyin Performance (亞細安南樂大會奏), which helped to revive Nanyin. In addition, in order to educate young people about this performance art, he also published two books on Nanyin and Liyuan opera.

Currently, the Siong Leng Musical Association is led by Ding Honghai (丁宏海), and it continues to promote Nanyin in Singapore.

Footprints of Pe̍h-ōe-jī

There are some letters written in Pe̍h-ōe-jī from early Hokkien migrants in Singapore.

An example was provided by the descendant of Tan Book Hak, a cousin of Tan Kah Kee.

Places in Singapore

Singapore's Chinese name "新加坡" (sin-ka-pho) originated from Hokkien's transliteration of "Singapore". In addition, there are many other place names in Singapore that originated from Hokkien: Ang Mo Kio and Toa Payoh, for instance.

See also

 Hoklo people
 Hokkien culture
 Hokkien architecture
 Written Hokkien
 Hokkien media
 Holopedia
 Hokkien influence on Singaporean Mandarin
 Speak Hokkien Campaign
 Singaporean Mandarin
 Singdarin

Notes

References

Academic sources

External links
Holopedia - Wikipedia in Peh-oe-ji (Wikipedia in Hokkien)
Online Hokkien Forum (in English)
 閩南人 The Hokkiens——新加坡國家圖書館館藏選介

Chinese languages in Singapore
Hokkien-language dialects
Languages of Singapore